Epistrema is a genus of moths of the family Noctuidae. The genus was described by Schaus in 1913.

Taxonomy
The Global Lepidoptera Names Index gives this name as a synonym of Eustrotia Hübner, [1821].

Species
Epistrema glaucosticta Schaus, 1916 Panama
Epistrema ora Schaus, 1913 Costa Rica
Epistrema sabularea (Schaus, 1906) Brazil (São Paulo)

References

Acontiinae